is a Kamen Rider Series Japanese TV special that aired on January 3, 1984. It is a special meant to celebrate the birth of Kamen Rider ZX, the 10th person to don the Kamen Rider title. Prior to the special, ZX appeared in a manga from 1982 to 1983.

Plot summary
Ryo Murasame is an aircraft pilot. One day he is taking his sister out on a ride along the Amazon when they are shot down by a UFO. They survive only to be captured by the Badan Empire. His sister is killed, while Ryo becomes the Combat Roid known as ZX. His memory is erased by the Badan Empire, and he works as their agent of evil. This doesn't last long; an accident occurs which causes Ryo to regain his memory and escape Badan. A year later, Ryo begins his attack on Badan as they finish the preparations for their doomsday weapon: the Space Break System. A coordinated attack by all of the Kamen Riders disables the Badancium 84 supplies needed for the Space Break System to work. When Ryo arrives, he Believes Kamen Riders V3, Riderman and Super-1 are enemies. The other Riders get him to listen to them and only one truck full of Badancium 84 makes it to Badan's base run by Ambassador Darkness.

After being shown a video detailing the history of Kamen Riders 1 to Super-1, Ryo is amazed that there are others like him. He then joins the Kamen Riders in raiding the base. However, during the raid, he encounters his former comrade, Mikage, who forces him to fight as Tigeroid. After being forced to kill his friend, ZX joins the other 9 Kamen Riders as they battle Ambassador Darkness, Monster Roids, and the Combat Roids. When Ambassador Darkness uses the Space Break System on the Kamen Riders, they synch their powers with ZX, using his ZX Kick to kill Ambassador Darkness and destroy Badan's base even as its Great Leader appears and bids the Riders farewell. Soon after, ZX joins the ranks of the Kamen Riders as their 10th member.

Characters
: Ryo is an aircraft pilot, he lives with his sister and it's presumed he lived with his parents. He is impulsive and hesitates to trust the veteran Riders when he first encounters them. He has the most cybernetic body out of any Kamen Rider created thus far. His body has many hidden abilities reminiscent of a ninja, including shuriken and chain-sickles. He does not give himself the Kamen Rider moniker until the final confrontation.
: She is a girl who is the daughter of a doctor who was killed by Badan. She gives Ryo temporary peacefulness.
: He is Ryo's father's friend, is a researcher of biochemistry, and is also a teacher at a university. He cooperates with Ryo unstintingly.
: She is a newspaper reporter and Ryo's elder sister. While investigating rumors of a UFO with Ryo, she is caught by Badan. Since she got to know Badan's secret, she is executed in an electric chair.
: He is the oldest Rider to appear out of his suit. He is the leader of the Japanese division of the Rider Organization while Kamen Riders 1 and 2 are in America. Apparently, he is the strongest of the veteran Riders as he was the only one able to hold off ZX.
: The second oldest Kamen Rider in the special. He is V3's partner in leading the Kamen Riders when Kamen Riders 1 and 2 are away.
: The youngest (at the time) of the veteran Riders, he tries to persuade ZX into joining the Riders without having to fight.

Badan Empire
The  claims to be the successor of all previous groups that attempted to conquer the world but fell without fulfilling that ambition. In Kamen Rider Spirits, several references infer that the Badan Empire was actually created by an alien entity, and supported terrorist groups starting with Shocker secretly working towards bringing the true form of their leader to Earth. Badan later resurfaces during the events of Ressha Sentai ToQger vs. Kamen Rider Gaim: Spring Break Combined Special and Heisei Rider vs. Shōwa Rider: Kamen Rider Taisen feat. Super Sentai.

 : A giant skull that appears after Ambassador Darkness' death. It disappears after laughing at the ten Riders. Dr. Kaidō said that it is the energy of an evil spirit. He has his own language, which he can telepathically compel others to understand.
 : He is the leader of the Badan Empire and the brother of Ambassador Hell of the organization Shocker. He is a maniacal man who is hellbent on getting what he wants. He is the one that ordered Ryo's plane to be shot down, thus killing his older sister. He is destroyed by Kamen Rider ZX's ZX Kick. In the manga, he is transformed into  who is a horned turbanlike monster.
 : He is a cyborg that is able to produce a wide variety of artillery from his body and has attributes and abilities equal to Ryo, thinking that power is justice. In the manga, he is originally an Interpol office. He was destroyed by Kamen Rider ZX's ZX Kick.

Cast
 Shun Sugata as Ryo Murasame
 Hiroshi Miyauchi as Shiro Kazami
 Takehisa Yamaguchi as Joji Yuki
 Shunsuke Takasugi as Kazuya Oki
 Tetsuya Nakayashiki (Played as 中屋敷 鉄也) as Eisuke Mikage, Jigokuroid (voice)
 Kenji Ushio as Ambassador Darkness
 Eiji Karasawa as Dr. Hajime Kaidō
 Kaneomi Ōya as Dr. Itō
 Yumiko Miyake as Rumi Ichijō
 Toshie Fukushima as Shizuka Murasame
 Takeshi Sasaki as Kamen Rider 2 (voice)
 Michihiro Ikemizu as Kamen Rider 1 (voice)
 Keisuke Yamashita as Kamen Rider X (voice)
 Tetsuya Kaji as Skyrider (voice)
 Kazuo Niibori as Kamakiroid (voice)
 Goro Naya as The Generalissimo of Badan (voice)
 Shinji Nakae as Narrator

Songs
Opening theme

Lyrics: Shotaro Ishinomori
Composition: Shunsuke Kikuchi
Arrangement: 
Artist: Akira Kushida

Ending theme

Lyrics: Shotaro Ishinomori
Composition & Arrangement: Shunsuke Kikuchi
Artist: Masato Shimon (as Kōichi Fuji) with Male Harmony

External links 
 

Japanese television specials
1984 television specials
Crossover tokusatsu television series
Kamen Rider
1984 films